Aloof may refer to:

 The Aloof, a British band
 A fictional race in the novel Incandescence by Greg Egan